The Kalbermatten Woopy is a Swiss high-wing, single-place, hang glider that was designed by Laurent de Kalbermatten of Villars-sur-Glâne. The aircraft seems to have been just developed to prototype stage and it is not clear if production was undertaken.

Design and development
The Woopy fuselage is made from aluminum tubing, with a conventional tail, a seated pilot position and weight shift controls. The wing is inflatable and based on the same concept as an air mattress, kept inflated by two small battery-powered fans. Launch and landing is carried out on foot.

Much of the development was undertaken using scale flying models to speed construction and reduce pilot risk.

Two models were developed, the Woopy Fly and the Woopy Jump, plus a powered version of the Woopy Fly.

Variants
Woopy Fly
Initial model.
Powered Woopy Fly
Woopy Jump
More portable development model.

Specifications (Woopy Fly)

References

External links
Photo of a Kalbermatten Woopy

Woopy
Hang gliders